Brittany Diego (born 1994) is an American fashion stylist and founder of Fashion Mentor based in Los Angeles, California. She has worked for Trevor Jackson, Draya Michele, Karen Civil, DaniLeigh and companies including TechStyle Fashion Group, MTV and The CW.

Biography

Early life and education 
Diego was born in Belize before moving to Los Angeles in the early 2000's. Diego wanted to be in the fashion industry since the age of ten and set her sights on becoming a fashion designer. She attended Downtown Magnets High School in the Academy of Fashion Design & Merchandising, and attended Woodbury University where she majored in fashion design and worked on various internships.

Career 
After graduating college, she was disappointed because of her only landing internships but also because of the "toxic mindset in the industry that needed to be corrected." She then landed a job with an employer who, shortly after, laid her off. After that, she spent her time on creating a new company called Fashion Mentor. She struggled when opening the business, saying in an interview, "burnt myself out. I quickly realized, if I wanted Fashion Mentor to grow, I would need help from others who supported my vision, and it was the best decision I ever made." She then started being independent, documenting her works on Instagram where she also gave advice to others like her.

In 2021, she was featured on Forbess Next 1000.

 Fashion Mentor Fashion Mentor' is described as a "career development platform that provides millennials with the tools, resources, and knowledge to lead successful careers in the fashion industry through digital products, workshops, and virtual classes." Diego started the company as a way to have up-and-coming stylists have a successful career with the right resources.

It was originally a blog that documented things she learned before expanding into a digital platform with a podcast, YouTube channel and an online community. It has started classes since March 2019.

References

External links 
Official website

Woodbury University alumni
Fashion stylists
1994 births
Living people